Kings Peak may refer to:

 Kings Peak (British Columbia), a mountain in British Columbia, Canada
 Kings Peak (Idaho), a mountain in the Clearwater Mountains range in Benewah County, Idaho, United States
 Kings Peak (Utah), a mountain in the Uinta Mountains range in Duchesne County, Utah, United States, and the highest point in the state

See also
 South Kings Peak, Utah, United States
 King Peak (disambiguation)
 Mount King (disambiguation)